Yu-jin, also spelled Yoo-jin, is a unisex given name of Korean origin, its meaning dependent upon the hanja used to write it. There are numerous possibilities as to how to spell the name in hanja; there are 62 hanja that can be used to represent the yu sound and 48 hanja that can be used to represent the jin sound. The name is popular as not only is a traditional Korean name but can be romanized as Eugene, allowing children to have not only a name that is Korean in origin but easy for Westerners to pronounce. In the early 2000s, Yu-jin was among the most popular names for baby boys, but later in the decade, it saw a fall in popularity, and by 2008 Yu-jin had fallen out of the top ten.

People
People with this name include:

Sportspeople
Kim Yoo-jin (footballer, born 1981), South Korean female footballer
Kim Yoo-jin (footballer, born 1983), South Korean male football player
Jeong You-jin (born 1983), South Korean male sport shooter
Lim Yu-jin (born 1983), South Korean female volleyball player
Ji Yoo-jin (born 1988), South Korean female rower
Hong Yoo-jin (born 1989), South Korean female field hockey player
Choi Yu-jin (figure skater) (born 2000), South Korean female figure skater
Jang Yu-jin (born 2001), South Korean female freestyle skier

Film and television actors
Ryu Jin (born Im Yu-jin, 1972), South Korean actor
Eugene (actress) (born Kim Yoo-jin, 1981), South Korean actress and idol singer, member of S.E.S.
So Yoo-jin (born 1981), South Korean actress
Uee (born Kim Yu-jin, 1988), South Korean actress and idol singer 
Jung Yoo-jin (born 1989), South Korean actress
Eugene Lee Yang (born 1986), American comedian and member of The Try Guys

Singers
Lee Yoo-jin (actress) (born 1977), South Korean female actress and model
H-Eugene (born Heo Yu-jin, 1979), South Korean male recording artist
Neon Bunny (born Im Yujin, 1983), South Korean singer-songwriter
Eyedi (born Nam Yu-jin, 1995), South Korean female singer-songwriter 
Choi Yu-jin (born 1996), South Korean female singer, member of CLC and leader of Kep1er
An Yu-jin (born 2003), South Korean female singer, leader of Ive (formerly Iz*One)

Other
Kim Yoo-jin (director) (born 1950), South Korean male director
Yoojin Grace Wuertz (born 1980), South Korean-born American female novelist
Kim Yoo-jin (StarCraft player) (born 1993), South Korean male professional StarCraft II player

Fictional characters
Fictional characters with this name include:
Jung Yoo-jin, in 2002 South Korean television series Winter Sonata
Choi Yu-Jin, in 2018 South Korean television series Mr. Sunshine
Yun-Jin Lee, in Dead by Daylight DLC - All Kill Chapter
Lee Yu-Jin, in 2021 South Korean drama [Imitation]

See also
Eugene Group, South Korean chaebol with business interests in construction, media, and other industries

References

Korean unisex given names